The mixed ISSF 25 meter rapid fire pistol shooting competition at the 1980 Summer Olympics was held on 25 July at the Dynamo Shooting Range in Moscow, USSR. There were 40 competitors from 25 nations. Nations had been limited to two shooters each since the 1952 Games. The event was won by Corneliu Ion of Romania, the nation's first victory in the event since 1956 and second overall (tying Poland and Hungary for second-most all-time, behind the United States with 3). East German Jürgen Wiefel repeated as silver medalist, becoming the sixth man to win multiple medals in the event. Austria earned its first rapid fire pistol medal with Gerhard Petritsch's bronze.

Background
This was the 16th appearance of what had been standardised in 1948 as the men's ISSF 25 meter rapid fire pistol event, the only event on the 2020 programme that traces back to 1896. The event has been held at every Summer Olympics except 1904 and 1928 (when no shooting events were held) and 1908; it was nominally open to women from 1968 to 1980, although very few women participated these years. The first five events were quite different, with some level of consistency finally beginning with the 1932 event—which, though it had differences from the 1924 competition, was roughly similar. The 1936 competition followed the 1932 one quite closely. The post-World War II event substantially altered the competition once again.

Six of the top 10 shooters from 1976 returned: silver medalist Jürgen Wiefel of East Germany, bronze medalist Roberto Ferraris of Italy, fourth-place finisher Afanasijs Kuzmins of the Soviet Union, fifth-place finisher Corneliu Ion of Romania, seventh-place finisher Gerhard Petritsch of Austria, and eighth-place finisher Marin Stan of Romania. Ove Gunnarsson of Sweden was the reigning world champion (1978); the runner-up (West German Werner Beier) was absent due to the American-led boycott. Petritsch had finished third at worlds.

Costa Rica, Ireland, Laos, and Zimbabwe each made their debut in the event. Italy made its 12th appearance, most of any competing nation and second-most of all nations behind the boycotting United States at 13.

Competition format
The competition format followed the 1948 format, now very close to the modern rapid fire pistol competition after significant variation before World War II. Each shooter fired 60 shots. These were done in two courses of 30; each course consisted of two stages of 15; each stage consisted of three series of 5. In each stage, the time limit for each series was 8 seconds for the first, 6 seconds for the second, and 4 seconds for the third. Ties for medals were broken via shoot-off, with each shoot-off round consisting of 3 series of 5 shots.

A holdover from the previous Games was that silhouettes, rather than round targets, continued to be used; however, scoring rings had been added so that now each shot was scored up to 10 rather than being strictly hit or miss.

One change from 1948–1956 was that hits were no longer the primary measurement of success. As in 1960–1976, ranking was done by score, regardless of hits.

Records
Prior to the competition, the existing world and Olympic records were as follows.

No new world or Olympic records were set during the competition.

Schedule

Results

 Shoot-off

References

Shooting at the 1980 Summer Olympics
Men's 1980